{{Infobox multi-sport competition event
|event = Men's 4 × 100 metres relay
|competition = 2022 World Athletics U20 Championships
|image =
|caption =
|venue = Estadio Olímpico Pascual Guerrero
|dates = 4 August (round 1)5 August (final)
|competitors = 28
|nations = 18
|win_value = 39.35
|gold = Kowa IkeshitaHiroto FujiwaraShunki Tateno
|goldNOC= JPN
|silver = Bouwahjgie NkrumieBryan LevellMark-Anthony DaleyAdrian KerrDavid Lynch
|silverNOC= JAM
|bronze = Laurenz ColbertMichael GizziBrandon MillerJohnny BrackinsDavid FosterCharlie Bartholomiew''
|bronzeNOC= USA
|prev = 2021
|next = 2024
}}

The men's 4 × 100 metres relay at the 2022 World Athletics U20 Championships''' was held at the Estadio Olímpico Pascual Guerrero in Cali, Colombia on 4 and 5 August 2022.

25 national teams entered to the competition, with each team having a minimum of 4 and maximun of 6 athletes.

Records
U20 standing records prior to the 2022 World Athletics U20 Championships were as follows:

Teams
The 25 national teams entered a total of 136 athletes, Each team selected 4 athletes from their list in each round, however, the team selected for the round 1 could be made up of athletes entered by te nation in other events.

 : 
 Connor Bond
 Jai Gordon 
 Lachlan Kennedy
 Calab Law 
 Aidan Murphy
 Ryan Tarrant
 : 
 Antoine Andrews
 Carlos Brown Jr.
 Zion Campbell 
 Zachary Evans
 Wanya McCoy
 : 
 Abofelo Leitseng
 Godiraone Lobatlamang
 Mooketsi Luzani
 Thuso Omphile
 Lundi Pinaemang
 Letsile Tebogo 
 : 
 Izaias Alves
 Renan Correa
 Lucas Gabriel Fernandes
 Matheus Lima
 Thamer Moreira 
 :
 Tyler Floyd
 Desmond Fraser 
 Daniel Kidd
 Christopher Morales-Williams
 Nate Paris 
 Alomd Small
 :
 Oscar Baltán
 Carlos Florez
 Yerlin González
 Ronal Longa
 Brayan Ramos 
 Javier Robledo
 :
 Juan Carlos Castillo
 Mario Mena
 Jaime Mendoza
 Álvaro Rodríguez 
 Alejandro Rueda
 Jaime Sancho
 :
 Juho Alasaari
 Topi Huttunen
 Niko Kangasoja
 Joonas Lapinkero
 Valtteri Louko
 Rasmus Martin 
 :
 Grégory Afoy
 Hugo Cerra
 Jeff Erius
 Dejan Ottou
 Loukas Rangasamy
 :
 Emmanuel Duruiheoma
 Olutimilehin Esan
 Medwin Odamtten
 Michael Onilogbo
 Tyler Panton
 Jeriel Quainoo
 :
 Bela Djalo Corca
 Ole Ehrhardt
 Heiko Gussmann
 Vincent Herbst
 Tobias Morawietz
 Chidiera Onuoha
 :
 Alessio Faggin
 Eduardo Longobardi
 Alessandro Malvezzi
 Samuele Rignanese
 Loris Tonella
 :
 Mark-Anthony Daley
 Sandrey Davison
 Adrian Kerr
 Dishaun Lamb
 David Lynch
 Bouwahjgie Nkrumie
 :
 Tatsuki Abe
 Hiroto Fujiwara
 Kowa Ikeshita
 Ryona Manago
 Shunji Tateno
 Hiroki Yanagita
 :
 Maurice Afognon
 Nsikak Ekpo
 Jamie Sesay
 Matthew Sophia
 Daniljo Vriendwijk
 :
 Kayinsola Ajayi
 Raphael Egbuchilem
 Adekalu Fakorede
 Ogheneovo Mabilo
 Nurain Musa
 Godson Oghenebrume
 :
 Luis Angulo
 Ismael Arévalo
 Rodrigo Cornejo
 Aron Eart
 :
 Michał Gorzkowicz
 Dawid Grząka
 Hubert Kozelan
 Damian Soból
 Marek Zakrzewski
 :
 K'Anthony Benjamin
 Shamarie Newton-Roberts
 Aldrett Nisbett
 William Sharpe
 Akadianto Willett
 :
 Hassan Al-Absi
 Mohammed Khaled Al-Khalidi
 Ali Abdullah Al Tawfeeq
 Sultan Kaabi
 Hattan Majrashi
 :
 Letlhogonolo Moleyane
 Bradley Nkoana
 Bradley Oliphant
 Benjamin Richardson
 Mukhethwa Tshifura
 :
 Nicolas Bersier
 Mathieu Chèvre
 Gaspar Martinez-Aldama
 Matthieu Normand
 Giovanni Pirolli
 Jérémy Valnet
 :
 Puripool Boonson
 Thawatchai Himaiad
 Natawat Imaudom
 Muhamad Salaeh
 Watchapol Thanthong
 :
 Devin Augustine
 Jaden De Souza
 Anthony Diaz 
 Shakeem Mc Kay
 Elijah Simmons
 Revell Webster
 :
 Laurenz Colbert
 David Foster
 Michael Gizzi
 Brandon Miller

Results

Round 1
The round 1 took place on 4 August, with the 25 teams involved being splitted into 4 heats, 1 heat of 7 athletes and 3 heats of 6. The first team in each heat ( Q ) and the next 4 fastest ( q ) qualified to the final. The overall results were as follows:

Final
The final (originally set for 18:00) was started at 19:09 on 5 August. The results were as follows:

References

Relay 4 x 100 metres
Relays at the World Athletics U20 Championships